"Sweetest Smile" is a song by English singer Black, released in June 1987 as the third single from his debut album Wonderful Life. It became his first UK top ten hit, peaking at number 8 on the UK Singles Chart. On the back of its success, "Wonderful Life" was re-released, becoming an international hit.

Meaning and reception 
Speaking in an interview with Smash Hits in 1987, he said of the song "It's me singing me story of everything that happened to me in 1985, which was a rotten year. Basically my heart was broken. I was… erm, I'm technically married. Er… I've got an imminent divorce – I've been separated for two years. Er… I've never told anyone that, I shouldn't have said it! Er… yeah, so that was 1985, along with lots of other things, me family falling ill and me friends going through all sorts of stuff… I'm alright now though. Just about."

The song was reviewed in Record Mirror and was described as "a beautiful, slow croon. Sufficiently different from the usual conveyor-belt of identikit hits to distract the listener and stretch their attention span to four minutes."

Track listings 
7"

 "Sweetest Smile" – 4:22
 "Sixteens" – 3:56

12" / CD / cassette

 "Sweetest Smile" – 5:21
 "Sixteens" – 3:56
 "Leave Yourself Alone" – 4:32
 "Hardly Star-Crossed Lovers" – 2:51

Personnel 
Musicians

 Colin Vearncombe – vocals
 Dave "Dix" Dickie – keyboards
 Roy Corkill – fretless bass
 Jimmy Hughes – drums
 Martin Green – soprano saxophone

Technical

 John Warwicker – art direction, design
 Jeremy Pearce – design
 Perry Ogden – photography

Charts

References 

1987 songs
1987 singles
A&M Records singles
Black (singer) songs
Pop ballads